Jessy may refer to:

Given name
Jessy Bulbo (born 1974), Mexican singer-songwriter
Jessy Chahal, celebrity in Malaysia
Jessy De Smet (born 1976), Belgian dance music singer
Jessy Dixon (1938–2011), American gospel music singer, songwriter, and pianist
Jessy Greene, violinist, cellist and vocalist from Sheffield, Massachusetts
Jessy Hodges, American actress
Jessy J (born 1982), American musician in the contemporary jazz music genre
Jessy Kramer (born 1990), Dutch team handball player
Jessy Matador (born 1982), singer from France
Jessy Mendiola (born 1992), Filipino actress
Jessy Moss, singer/rapper
Jesy Nelson, singer and former member of British girl group Little Mix
Jessy Rompies (born 1990), Indonesian professional tennis player
Jessy Schram (born 1986), American actress
Jessy Serrata (1953–2017), American Tejano musician and vocalist
Jessy Terrero (born 1975), Dominican film and music video director

Middle name 
Annie Jessy Curwen (1845–1932), Irish writer and pianist
Sally Jessy Raphael (born 1935), American talk show host

Film
Jessy (movie) or Ye Maaya Chesave, a 2010 Telugu-language romantic movie

See also
Jeassy (1936–2001)
Jesse (biblical figure)
Jesse (disambiguation)
Jessea
Jessica (disambiguation)
Jessie (disambiguation)